"L'Équipe à Jojo" is a song by Joe Dassin from his 1970 album Joe Dassin (La Fleur aux dents). In 1971 it was released as a single.

Writing and composition 
The song was written and composed by Claude Lemesle. He wrote it when he was just 25 and still feels a particular tenderness towards it. Lemesle recalled to Le Figaro:

Commercial performance 
Unlike the album Joe Dassin (La Fleur aux dents), the single "L'Équipe à Jojo" didn't sell well.

Track listing 
7" single CBS 7151 (1971)
A. "L'équipe à Jojo" (3:08)
B. "Le Portugais" (2:40)

Cover versions 
The song was covered by Les Objets on the various-artists compilation album L'équipe à JoJo – Les Chansons de Joe Dassin par... (1993).

References

External links 
 Joe Dassin – "L'équipe à Jojo / Le Portugais" at Discogs

1970 songs
1971 singles
Joe Dassin songs
French songs
CBS Disques singles
Songs written by Claude Lemesle
Song recordings produced by Jacques Plait